During the 1950–51 season Juventus Football Club competed in Serie A and the Rio Cup.

Summary
The team played a decent season with Hansen and Præst having been joined by another Dane, captain of the 1948 Olympic team Karl Aage Hansen who came from Serie A rivals Atalanta Bergamo. The great level of understanding of those three great Danes, together with Giampiero Boniperti, delivered a superb campaign that produced a milestone of 103 goals scored.

However, coach Jesse Carver was fired by the club in August 1951 as the 3rd place in the league standings behind Milan and Inter was deemed not good enough.

Squad

Competitions

Serie A

League table

Matches

Copa Rio

Group Sao Paulo

Semifinals

Final

Statistics

Player statistics

References

External links 
 
 
 
 
 
 

Juventus F.C. seasons
Juventus